Vevey Riviera Basket, also known as Riviera Lakers, is a Swiss basketball club based in Vevey. It plays in the first national tier.

History
The club was founded in 1952 as Vevey Basket. Vevey won the Swiss League championship 2 times, in the years 1984 and 1991. Their first Swiss League championship came under coach Jim Boylan. They also won the Swiss Cup three times, in the years 1983, 1984, and 1985.

Vevey qualified to the Korać Cup for the 1974–75 and 1987–88 seasons. Vevey qualified for the Saporta Cup in the 1983–84 and 1985–86 seasons. Vevey also qualified to the EuroLeague for the 1984–85 season. They also played in the knockout rounds of both the 1991–92 Euroleague and the 1991–92 Saporta Cup. In 1998 Vevey merged with Blonay Basket and change its name to Vevey Riviera Basket.

Thabo Sefolosha began his senior men's club career with Vevey.

Notable players

 Thabo Sefolosha (1 season: 2001–02)
 Jim Boylan
 Jim Grandholm
 Dave Angstadt
 Vince Reynolds
 Herb Johnson
 Wayne Yearwood
 Brett Beeson
 Herman Alston
 Lee Matthews
 Dwight Walton
 Babacar Touré
 Bojan Lapov

Head coaches
 Nathan Zana

References

External links
Official Website 
Eurobasket.com Team Profile

 
Basketball teams in Switzerland
1952 establishments in Switzerland
Basketball teams established in 1952